The Colonial was an American automobile manufactured in 1920 by the Mechanical Development Corporation of San Francisco.

The car came with a straight-eight engine; it also featured disc wheels, with an extra pair mounted at the side as spares.  The body was a hardtop, calibrated so that the driver could turn it into either a sedan or a touring car simply by rearranging the windows.  Production models were to sell for $1800, but only the prototype was completed.

The Colonial is chiefly remembered today because it was the first American car to feature four-wheel hydraulic brakes. The Mechanical Development Corporation announced in 1924 that the 1921 prototype would be put into production in a new $2.5 million factory which could build 12,000 cars a year, but these plans never eventualized. The prototype Colonial still survives.

See also
Colonial (1921 automobile)
Colonial (Shaw automobile)

References

Defunct motor vehicle manufacturers of the United States
Motor vehicle manufacturers based in California